John Haack is an American powerlifter and chemist. He is the current world record holder in the raw (without knee wraps) 90 and 100 kilogram weight class. He set the previous 82.5 kg world record of 907.5 kg on August 3, 2019 at the age of 26 at the Tribute powerlifting meet in San Antonio, Texas.  For this total, he squatted 312.5 kg, bench pressed 232.5 kg, and deadlifted 362.5 kg. This total beat his own previous records of 890 kg (set April 20, 2019) and 875 kg (set December 15, 2018). The previous record holder in this weight class was Maliek Derstine, with a total of 862.5 kg on January 23, 2016.   

Haack is also the world record holder in the raw (without knee wraps) 90 kilogram weight class.  He broke the previous record for his first time on January 19, 2020 with a total of 932.5 kg (327.5 kg squat, 237.5 kg bench press, 367.5 kg deadlift), beating the previous record of 922.5 kg set by Jesse Norris on November 7, 2015.  John's most recent record in the 90 kilogram weight class was set on September 25th, 2021. John managed a raw, sleeved total of 1005.5kg (340 kg squat, 263 kg bench press, 402.5 kg deadlift). This record also managed to beat the raw, sleeved records of the 100 kilograms (972.5kg) by Yury Belkin and 110 kilograms (1,000 kg) by Jamal Browner. 

Before switching to the USPA (United States powerlifting association), he was the 2016 International Powerlifting Federation (the major drug-tested powerlifting organization worldwide) world champion in the classic (raw without wraps) 83 kg weight class, beating multiple IPF world champion Brett Gibbs with an IPF world record total of 813 kg (298 kg squat, 200 kg bench, 315 kg deadlift). This IPF world record has since been beaten by Brett Gibbs in the 2018 IPF world championships with a total of 830.5 kg and by Russel Orhii with a total of 833 kg in the 2019 IPF world championships.

In 2022, at the WRPF American Pro, Haack set a new record at the 89 kilogram weight class (raw). He totaled 1022 kilograms (2254.2 pounds). For this total, he squatted 345 kg (760.6 lb), benched 267.5 kg (589.7 lb), and deadlifted 410 kg (903.9 lb).

See also
 List of powerlifters

References

External links 
 John Haack's Instagram account
 John Haack's powerlifting meets on openpowerlifting.org

American powerlifters
Living people
Year of birth missing (living people)